"Every Kinda People" is a song originally performed by Robert Palmer on his 1978 album Double Fun. It was released as the album's lead single in March 1978. The song was written by Andy Fraser.

Original version
The song reached No. 53 in the United Kingdom and at No. 16 in the United States, making Palmer's first top 40 hit on that country. The original version also charted on the US Billboard Adult Contemporary chart, peaking at number 22.

1992 remix
Palmer released a re-mixed version of this song on his 1992 compilation album Addictions: Volume 2, as the lead single from that album, ultimately becoming a radio hit, peaking at number 8 on the US Billboard Adult Contemporary chart. In the UK, the remix did better than its original 1978 release, peaking at number 43.

Most noteworthy is the near-absence of Bob Babbitt's bass-heavy guitar hook, replaced by an acoustic guitar figure, giving it an "unplugged" feel as was the fashion at the time by well-established artists remaking past hits as acoustic numbers.

Charts

1978 original version

1992 remix

Cover versions
With its blend of Caribbean steel pan, violins and moving lyrics, "Every Kinda People" has become one of Palmer's best-loved songs, covered multiple times by other artists including the Mint Juleps (1987), Randy Crawford (1989), Chaka Demus and Pliers (1996), Amy Grant (1996), Jo O'Meara (2002), Joe Cocker (2004) and Ana Popovic (2013), and cited by music fans and spiritual groups for its positive message of peace and multiculturalism.

Sampling 
The same melody as in the chorus of the song "Every Kinda People" is used in the following five songs: Van Morrison's 1982 song "Dweller on the Threshold", Terence Trent D'Arby's 1987 song "Dance Little Sister", U Škripcu's 1991 song "Izgleda da mi smo sami", Michael Jackson's 1997 song "Blood on the Dance Floor", and Nino's 1998 song "Ko te samo takne".

Personnel
Robert Palmer – vocals, guitar
Paul Barrere & Freddie Harris – guitar
James Alan Smith – keyboards
Bob Babbitt – bass
Allan Schwartzberg – drums
Robert Greenridge - steel drums
Jody Linscott - percussion

References

External links
Robert Palmer - Every Kinda People on YouTube

1978 songs
1978 singles
1992 singles
Robert Palmer (singer) songs
Chaka Demus & Pliers songs
Island Records singles
Songs written by Andy Fraser